is a Japanese manga series written and illustrated by Seishi Kishimoto, creator of 666 Satan, and was published in Shōnen Rival. Sega also developed a Nintendo DS game using a parallel story.

Plot

Taking place in a futuristic style of Tokyo, Japan. Society has harnessed the power of the elements into items known as "Mystickers" which give off various effects depending on which is used and can be applied to everyday housework or even combat. Daichi is a young teen that resents his older brother but finds comfort in his dealings with friends. After an encounter with some bullies Daichi discovers he has the potential to become a Blazer, people who are able to apply these "Mystickers" unto their skin without causing harm to their own bodies. It isn't after another deadly encounter with an unknown assailant of an organization that's targeting him that Daichi learns of his fate and that of his brother. At the cost of something precious, Daichi sets out to reclaim that which was taken, embarking on a dangerous quest with a new resolve and a powerful "Mysticker" of his own.

Setting

Mystickers
Mystickers are stickers that have special powers that can be placed on anything and anywhere. Mystickers are activated by first adhering them on a flat surface and then the user should trace the patterns imprinted on the Mysticker with their fingers. Qilin Mystickers are rare type of Mysticker and rumored that only five are in existence and that each Quilin mysticker chooses its owner. The five are Black Kakutan, White Sakumei, Blue Shouko, Crimson Enku, and Yellow Qilin.

Blazers
Blazers are a group of special people that are able to control the power of the MyStickers by sticking them onto their own bodies and manipulating their power. The strength of a Blazer comes from the power of the mind and concentration. If a Blazer has mastered those abilities, their powers will be at their maximum, and the sticker will be impossible to pull off by anyone other than the Blazer who is using the sticker. If the Blazer's mind is not concentrated, the Blazer will hurt himself and the sticker will easily peel off.

There are certain stickers that do not have any particular effect when used by normal people, but can be activated when used by a Blazer.

Chapters

References

External links
Official website 
Monthly Shōnen Rival website 

2008 manga
Shōnen manga
Kodansha manga